The Toyota RAV4 EV is an all-electric version of the popular RAV4 SUV produced by Toyota until 2014. Two generations of the EV model were sold in California, and to fleets elsewhere in the US, with a gap of almost ten years between them.

The first generation was leased from 1997 to 2003, and at the lessees' request, many units were sold after the vehicle was discontinued. A total of 1,484 were leased and/or sold in California to meet the state's mandate for zero-emissions vehicle. A small number were sold or leased in fleet sales in other states. As of mid-2012, there were almost 500 vehicles still in use in California. Production of the second generation EV was limited to 2,600 units during a three-year run, with sales limited to California beginning in 2012. Production ended in September 2014. A total of 2,489 units of the second generation model were sold in California through April 2015.

Toyota worked together with Tesla Motors and Panasonic to develop the second generation RAV4 EV, and the electric SUV was released in the United States in September 2012.

First generation (1997)

The first fleet version of the RAV4 EV became available on a limited basis in 1997. In 2001 it was possible for businesses, cities or utilities to lease one or two of these cars. Toyota then actually sold or leased 328 RAV4 EVs to the general public in 2003, at which time the program was terminated despite waiting lists of prospective customers.

The 95 amp-hour NiMH battery pack has a capacity of 27 kWh, charges inductively and has proven to be very durable. Some RAV4 EVs have been driven more than  using the original battery pack. It was also one of the few vehicles with a single speed gearbox when introduced to the market.

Beyond the unusual power train (batteries, controller and motor), the remaining systems in the RAV4 EV are comparable to the gasoline-powered RAV4. The power brakes, power steering, tire wear and suspension components are similar except that they use electric power sources. The power brakes use an electric pump to provide vacuum instead of deriving vacuum from the engine manifold. The power steering use an electric motor instead of mechanical energy delivered by fan belts. The passenger compartment is heated and cooled electrically using a heat pump (the first fleet application of a heat pump in a road vehicle) with supplemental electrical resistance heating as backup.

Performance
Actual fuel economy and range depends on the same factors as a traditional gasoline-powered vehicle including rolling resistance and average speed (aerodynamic drag).

The RAV4 EV battery pack uses 24 12-volt, 95Ah NiMH batteries capable of storing 27 kWh of energy.

Charging
The RAV4 EV's batteries can be recharged from being fully depleted to fully charged in about five hours, and are monitored with a passive battery balancing system. Electricity is supplied via a Magne Charge inductive charging paddle
from a wall-mounted 6000-Watt charging unit on a 240 volt, 30 amp, North American "clothes dryer"-type plug. Some earlier RAV4 EV prototypes were charged via a front fender conductive charger coupling made by Yazaki Corporation.

Mileage costs
Charging a RAV4 EV from full-dead to full-charge uses approximately 30 kW·h of electricity; the excess above the battery pack capacity is used by the charging system.

In addition, the RAV4 EV has a charge timer built into the dashboard that enables the vehicle to start charging at a specific time. As the RAV4 EV easily becomes the main cost of electricity in an average-sized home, this enables the owner to use a Time-Of-Day Meter to reduce electricity costs. This configuration is a standard practice with RAV4 EV owners. The price of electricity at night depends on the carrier, but is usually in the range of 60% of the normal rate.

The United States Environmental Protection Agency listed mileage ratings for the RAV4 EV in its yearly Fuel Economy Guide from 2000 through 2003.

Consumable items
The RAV4 EV's battery system is a consumable item. Toyota reports that battery pack replacement costs are currently higher than the value of the used vehicle. The economies of scale are affecting the replacement cost of the RAV4 EV.

Prototyping

RAV4 EV pre-production prototypes were first released in a confidential evaluation program with electric utilities throughout the U.S. These prototypes were based on the smaller, shorter, two-door version of the RAV4. The prototypes included some versions fitted with Panasonic NiMH batteries, and others with high-performance Panasonic lead–acid PbA batteries (the same ones that eventually found their way into the EV1 and other production GM electric vehicles). The RAV4 EV prototypes also were equipped with on-board level 2 chargers and connected via a front fender conductive charger coupling made by Yazaki Corporation. Both prototypes were well accepted.

The utility employee evaluators did not have to personally pay for the more costly and advanced NiMH batteries, and the NiMH RAV4 EV prototype received better reviews, due to its increased range. Its energy efficiency, however, was not as good as the PbA version. Due to the impracticality of developing two battery types for a limited volume program, Toyota opted for the higher-performance, higher-cost NiMH RAV4 EV. This resulted in a greater manufacturing cost, and higher purchase price.

A number of electric vehicle advocates voiced disappointment that the choice was made to manufacture only the NiMH version. Many electric vehicle advocates claimed that automaker's choice of the NiMH battery worked against the 1990s deployment of cost-effective electric vehicles based on PbA batteries, and that further development of lead–acid technology could result in performance equal to NiMH, but at a substantially lower price. Their argument was that a usable electric vehicle is possible at a substantially lower price, and that the lower purchase price would foster greater acceptance of electric vehicles. In fact, lithium-ion batteries soon displaced both nickel and lead from electromobiles.

Corporate purchasing

Initially, RAV4 EVs were only available for three-year fleet lease, not for sale and not for lease to the public, at a few dealerships beginning in 1997. From 2001, leases were made available to small "fleets of one" purportedly run by small businesses.

Public availability

In March 2002, due to a shift in corporate policy, the Toyota RAV4-EV was made available for sale to the general public. All 328 that Toyota made were sold. No one knows for certain what prompted Toyota to change their position on the RAV4-EV, since they had long since fulfilled their obligations under the MOA with the California Air Resources Board's zero-emissions vehicle (ZEV) mandate via its fleet lease program.

More RAV4-EVs were sold than had been planned for manufacture through standard assembly line techniques. Toyota filled every order despite the fact that the last few dozen vehicles had to be assembled from spare parts due to a shortfall of production components (a significantly more expensive way of building a vehicle). This unexpected development caused deliveries to trickle on into September 2003. It also caused variations in the vehicles such as heated seats, retractable antennae, mats, etc.

The last of the 328 EVs was sold in November 2002.

Sales
A total of 1,484 were leased and/or sold in California.

Chevron patent encumbrance

Whether or not Toyota wanted to continue production, it was unlikely to be able to do so because the EV-95 battery was no longer available. Chevron had inherited control of the worldwide patent rights for the NiMH EV-95 battery when it merged with Texaco, which had purchased them from General Motors. Chevron's unit won a  settlement from Toyota and Panasonic, and the production line for the large NiMH batteries was closed down and dismantled. This case was settled in the ICC International Court of Arbitration, and not publicized due to a gag order placed on Toyota. Only smaller NiMH batteries, incapable of powering an electric vehicle or plugging in, were allowed by Chevron-Texaco.

Second generation (2012) 

The second generation RAV4 EV was released in September 2012 starting at a price of  before any government incentives. The RAV4 EV was sold only in California, and sales began in the San Francisco Bay Area, Los Angeles/Orange County and San Diego. Production was limited to 2,600 during three years. The RAV4 EV was available to individual consumers and fleet customers. Due to the capacity of its battery pack the RAV4 EV qualified for the maximum  federal tax credit and also was eligible for a  rebate in California. A total of 192 units were sold during 2012 and 1,096 during 2013. A total of 2,489 units were sold in the U.S. through April 2015. The production run ended in September 2014.

History
The first prototype was built in just three weeks after the signing of a Tesla and Toyota joint development agreement
when Toyota helped Tesla start production in Toyota's old car factory NUMMI Fremont, Toyota's partner Panasonic was also involved in the development, just as when Toyota developed the first generation of the RAV4 EV, and testing began in July 2010.

A second generation RAV4 EV demonstrator was unveiled at the November 2010 Los Angeles Auto Show. Toyota built 35 of these converted RAV4s (Phase Zero vehicles) for a demonstration and evaluation program that ran through 2011. The lithium metal-oxide battery and other power train components were supplied by Tesla Motors. The re-engineered RAV4 EV production version (Phase One vehicle) was unveiled at the May 2012 International Electric Vehicle Symposium in Los Angeles.

The RAV4 EV battery pack, electronics and powertrain components in the production version are similar to those in used in the Tesla Model S sedan launched in June 2012, and the Phase Zero vehicles used components from the Tesla Roadster (2008).

Powertrain
The second generation RAV4 EV combines a Tesla/Panasonic-designed and produced battery and electric powertrain with Toyota's SUV model. The electric motor supplied by Tesla is an AC induction motor, a departure from Toyota's practice of using synchronous permanent-magnet motors in their hybrid electric vehicles. A fixed-gear open-differential transaxle has a gear ratio of 9.73. The RAV4 EV weighs ,  heavier than a front-wheel drive RAV4 Limited with the V-6 engine.

The RAV 4 offers two drive modes: Normal and Sport.

Battery and range
The battery pack is a 386 V lithium-ion battery pack comprising about 4,500 cells and rated at 41.8 kW·h of usable energy at full charge, with a maximum power output of 129 kW. The RAV4 EV features a 10 kW onboard charger (SAE J1772 240 V, 40 A input). The battery pack weighs  and because it is located in the lowest part of the vehicle, the lower center of gravity provides a better handling than the conventional Toyota RAV4.

The RAV4 EV has two charge modes: Standard and Extended. Extended mode allows the battery to charge to its full usable capacity of 41.8 kWh, providing an expected EPA driving range of  according to Toyota estimates. Standard mode is designed to optimize battery life over range; however, the 8-year, 100,000-mile battery warranty cover the packs regardless of the mix of charge modes over the pack's life.

Charging time with a 40 A/240 V charging station is 5 hours in Standard Mode and 6 hours for Extended Mode; the onboard charger delivers 9.6 kW at 40 amperes input, which yields a recharge time of 6 hours for Extended Mode. Toyota had arranged with Leviton to offer a custom level 2 charging station priced at  including basic installation. On the other end of the scale, and due to its large battery pack, charging at 120 volts with the cord that comes standard under the rear deck takes 44 hours for Standard Mode and 52 hours for Extended Mode.
An aftermarket company called Quick Charge Power  has come up with a way to add 48 kW CHAdeMO DC Quick Charging to the RAV4ev which dramatically shortens charge times for the 41.8 kWh battery. This can make the car tremendously more useful in areas where this charging infrastructure exists.

Production
Since May 2010, Toyota, Panasonic and Tesla Motors worked together to develop the second generation RAV4 EV using Tesla's electric motor and Toyota's platform and body. The electric SUV was developed by Tesla and Toyota Technical Center U.S.A. in Michigan. On July 15, 2011, Tesla entered into a supply and services agreement with Toyota for the supply of a validated electric powertrain system, including a battery, charging system, inverter, motor, gearbox and associated software, which would be integrated into an electric vehicle version of the Toyota RAV4.

The RAV4 EV began assembly in 2012 at Toyota's facility in Woodstock, Ontario alongside the regular gasoline version. Tesla builds the electric powertrain at its plant at Toyota's old NUMMI facility, now Tesla Factory, in Fremont, California, and then ships them to Canada. The battery supply deal between Toyota and Tesla concluded with the end of production in August 2014.

In 2017, Toyota sold all its shares in Tesla and started a new own electric car division.

See also
Patent encumbrance of large automotive NiMH batteries
Chevron Corporation
Toyota
Tesla Motors
Electric vehicle
Battery electric vehicle
PZEV
SULEV
AT-PZEV
Energy Conversion Devices Ovonics
Government incentives for plug-in electric vehicles
List of electric cars currently available
List of modern production plug-in electric vehicles
Plug-in electric vehicle

References

External links

Toyota USA's official RAV EV web site.

RAV4 EV
Production electric cars
Crossover sport utility vehicles
CARB's ZEV Mandate